The Richmond Curling Centre is an eight-sheet curling facility in Richmond, British Columbia that is the home of the Richmond Curling Club. The club is located on Hollybridge Way in the Richmond City Centre neighbourhood of the city.

The club was founded in 1958, with the first organizational meeting held on October 8 of that year. One week later a 3.4-acre plot of land was bought on Cambie Road for $200,000. The club was finally opened on January 1, 1961, as the Richmond Winter Club with plans to expand the facility to include skating and racket sports. Later that year the Richmond Ladies Curling Club was also founded. In 1963 a lounge was added to the building and in 1965 a parking lot was added.

After a deal with the City of Richmond, the club was moved from Cambie Road to its current location on Hollybridge.

Since 2000 the club has hosted the Pacific International Cup each April.

Provincial champions
The club has won a number of provincial curling titles over the years: The club was home to the 2000 Scott Tournament of Hearts champion, 2000 World Women's Curling Championship gold medalist and 2002 Winter Olympics bronze medal champion Kelley Law rink. The club also won the men's 2018 Travelers Curling Club Championship with the team of Vic Shimizu, Cody Tanaka, Trevor Bakken and Mark Yodogawa.

Women's
The club has won the women's provincial championships ten times: 
1977: Heather Kerr, Bernice McCallan, Shirley Snihur, Una Goodyear
1978: Heather Haywood, Bernice McCallan, Shirley Snihur, Una Goodyear
1983: Heather Kerr, Bernice McCallan, Sherry Lethbridge, Sandy McCubbin
1986: Heather Kerr, Bernice McCallan, Sherry Lethbridge, Rita Imai
1992: Lisa Anne Walker, Kelley Owen, Cindy McArdle, Cathy Sauer
1995: Marla Geiger, Kelley Owen, Sherry Fraser, Christine Jurgenson
1997: Kelley Owen, Marla Geiger, Sherry Fraser, Christine Jurgenson
2000: Kelley Law, Julie Skinner, Georgina Wheatcroft, Diane Nelson
2001: Shelley Macdonald, Lisa Whitaker, Adina Tasaka, Jacalyn Brown
2002: Kristy Lewis, Krista Bernard, Denise Blashko, Susan Allen

Junior Women's
1997: Julie Provost, Lindsay Kostenuik, Michelle Blacker, Nadine Favreau
2008: Kelly Thomson, Kelly Shimizu, Cynthia Lu, Jennifer Allen
2009: Kelly Shimizu, Kayte Gyles, Janelle Sakamoto, Julianna Tsang

Master Women's
2010: Karin Host, Lorraine Warn, Dianne Tasaka, Betty Dharmasetia
2011: Karin Host, Dianne Tasaka, Lorraine Warn, Betty Dharmasetia

Men's
The club has won the men's provincial championships three times: 
1968: Bob McCubbin, Jack Tucker, Ted Trimble, Keith Isaac
1973: Jack Tucker, Bernie Sparkes, Jim Armstrong, Gerry Peckham
1974: Jim Armstrong, Bernie Sparkes, Gerry Peckham, Clark Winterton

Junior Men's
1986: Graham Franklin, Rob Robinson, Steve Stroup, Stan Rick
2008: Jay Wakefield, Chase Martyn, Paul Cseke, Jamie Danbrook

Senior Men's
1999: Ken Watson, Ed Dezura, John Himbury, Howard Grisack (1999 Canadian Senior Curling Championships winners)
2009: Brian Gessner, John Smiley, Bill Rafter, Craig McLeod
2011: Greg McAulay, Ken Watson, Dale Hockley, Dale Reibin

Master Men's
2016: Keith Switzer, Vic Shimizu, Ben Nishi, Wayne Saito

Mixed
1967: Chuck Kennedy, Betty Bacon, Bruce Bacon, Verna Lawer
1973: Jim Armstrong, Marion Chamberlin, Gerry Peckham, Leslie Clark
1980: Bob McCubbin, Heater Haywood, Ken Watson, Sandy McCubbin
2018: Cody Tanaka, Shawna Jensen, Travis Cameron, Catera Park (shared with the Tunnel Town Curling Club)

References

Club history

External links
Official website

Curling clubs in Canada
Sport in Vancouver
Curling clubs established in 1958
1958 establishments in British Columbia
Curling in British Columbia
Sports venues in British Columbia
Richmond, British Columbia
Sports venues completed in 1958